John Jones (c. 1798/1799 – 7 January 1882) was an art collector. He bequeathed his collection to the South Kensington Museum (which is now the Victoria and Albert Museum). The collection is regarded as important for the French decorative arts of the 18th century.

Jones was born in Middlesex. He settled in London and became a tailor and clothier for the British army. Becoming wealthy, he retired from business in 1850. He devoted himself to collecting objets d'art, mostly French, which he exhibited in his house in Piccadilly. A catalogue of his bequest to the South Kensington Museum was published in 1882. The collection contains about 780 books and 1034 other items, including 313 prints, 105 paintings, 137 portrait miniatures, 147 pieces of porcelain,  and 135 pieces of furniture. The Jones collection contains the first three Shakespeare folios and examples of the work of the principal French cabinet-makers of the 18th-century, including Jean-François Oeben, Martin Carlin, Jean-François Leleu, and  Jean-Henri Riesener.

Bibliography
 « The Jones bequest to the South Kensington Museum », The Times, 12 December 1882.
 Handbook of the Jones Collection in the South Kensington Museum: with portrait and woodcuts, London: Published for the Committee of Council on Education by Chapman and Hall, 1883.
 Brief guide to the Jones Collection, London: HMSO, 1922.
 O. Brackett, Catalogue of the Jones Collection. Part 1: furniture, London: HMSO, 1922.
 Basil S. Long, Catalogue of the Jones Collection. Part 3: paintings and miniatures, London: HMSO, 1923. 
 Catalogue of the Jones Collection. Part 2: ceramics, ormolou, goldsmiths’ work, enamels, sculpture, tapestry, books and prints, London: HMSO, 1924.
 D. Sutton and others, « The Jones collection in the V&A Museum », Apollo, 1972, pp. 2–58. 
 C. M. Kauffmann, « Jones, John (1798/9–1882) », Oxford Dictionary of National Biography, Oxford: Oxford University Press, 2004.

References

1790s births
1882 deaths
Year of birth uncertain
English art collectors
Collections of the Victoria and Albert Museum